Mute is a 2005 short film by Melissa Joan Hart and is her directorial debut. The film was first released at the Palm Springs International Festival of Short Films on September 21, 2005, and stars her sister Emily Hart as Eileen, a woman determined to get revenge on her sister.

Synopsis
Eileen (Emily Hart) is a deaf-mute that is sabotaging her sister Claire's (Emily Deschanel) wedding out of a sense of retribution. She believes that Claire is responsible for the accident that left her unable to hear or talk, as Eileen had previously had an affair with her sister's fiancee, James (Dylan Neal). James refuses to believe that his future wife could be capable of such an act, which prompts Eileen's attempt at revenge.

Cast
Emily Hart as Eileen
Emily Deschanel as Claire
Dylan Neal as James
Garry Marshall as Pastor
Carlease Burke as Translator
Julie Albert as Violinist
Matt Boren as Cameraman
Bob Davidson as Dad
Jacob Jackson as Ring Bearer
Kristin Lipiro as Bartender

Reception
The Baltimore Sun gave a mixed review for Mute, stating that Hart "makes some unimaginative directorial choices, she does sustain the creepy mood, so the squalid little story could prove to be a successful jumping-off point for a career directing noirs."

References

External links
 

2005 short films
2005 films
American short films
2005 directorial debut films
2000s English-language films